Charles Merton (1821–31 December 1885) was a notable New Zealand bootmaker, teacher, musician and farmer. He was born in Haughley, Suffolk, England in about 1821.

References

1821 births
1885 deaths
New Zealand farmers
English emigrants to New Zealand
People from Mid Suffolk District